John "Jack" Pelech OC (1934–2008) was a Canadian litigation and business lawyer.

He was an amateur sports volunteer organizer and the guiding force behind the Canada Games from 1969. He helped launch the Participaction fitness campaign. He chaired Hamilton's bids for the Pan-American Games and Commonwealth Games and helped organize the Road World Cycling Championships and World Judo Championships.

Honours
 Hamilton Citizen of the Year, 1987
 McMaster Sports Hall of Fame Inductee, 1987
 Hamilton Gallery of Distinction Inductee, 2005
 Order of Canada, 2006
 The Jack Pelech Award named after him by Interprovincial Sport and Recreation Council to present to a provincial team best exemplifying performance and sportsmanship.

References

External links
 McMaster University Alumni Bio: John C. (Jack) Pelech

1934 births
2008 deaths
People from Hamilton, Ontario
Officers of the Order of Canada
Lawyers in Ontario